Hubeer is a Somali clan, traditionally settled in the Lower Shabelle region, though they also inhabit Jubaland, specifically Afmadow. The assassinated Somali Minister of Public Works Abbas Abdullahi Sheikh Siraji was a member of the Huber clan.

Though Hubeer is associated politically with Digil and Mirifle clans or Rahanwein, genealogically Hubeer is descended from the Yahabur and Samaale clans.

References

Somali clans